Robert Mahabir (born 16 November 1966) is a Trinidadian cricketer. He played in five first-class and seven List A matches for Trinidad and Tobago from 1988 to 1995.

See also
 List of Trinidadian representative cricketers

References

External links
 

1966 births
Living people
Trinidad and Tobago cricketers